Dieter Leisegang (November 25, 1942, in Wiesbaden – March 21, 1973, in Offenbach am Main) was a German author, philosopher, and broadcaster.

Life 
Dieter Leisegang was born on November 25, 1942, the eleventh child to painter and cartographer Gustav Leisegang. He spent his childhood in the city of Wiesbaden until his family relocated to Offenbach am Main in 1959. His first literary works and poems appeared in the 1950s and were published in newspapers, magazines, and anthologies.

After graduating secondary school, Leisegang studied history, German, and Philosophy at the Johann Wolfgang Goethe University, primarily under the instruction of Theodor W. Adorno and Julius Jakob Schaaf. Leisegang took Schaaf's approach of "Universal Relational Theory" and developed it further into a "draft of a philosophy of relationships", with which "Leisegang leaves behind a self-contained philosophical oeuvre, in which, with a staggering systematic power at the highest level of both introspection and argumentation, profound historical knowledge of the entire history of philosophy seamlessly unites" (Julius Schaaf).

In 1963 Leisegang met typographer and publisher Horst Heiderhoff, together with whom he released the poetry series "Das Neuste Gedicht" ("The Newest Poem"). In the same year, however, he was forced to take a break from his studies at the university due to a serious lung condition. After an operation, he was able to return to his studies in 1967. Already during his years at university Leisegang worked a variety of different jobs: as a teaching assistant for an aesthetics course at the Werkkunstschule (College of Design Offenbach) (1968–1960); as a lecturer for text and rhetoric at the Technical College for Industrial Advertising and Sales Promotion in Kassel (1968–1971); and as a freelancer in the editorial department “Art and Literature” for the Hessischer Rundfunk (Hessisch Broadcasting).

In 1969 he finished his doctorate in philosophy (Julius Schaaf/Theodore W. Adorno), German (Paul Stöcklein), and East European History (Klaus Zernack) with a dissertation on "The Three Powers of Relation". Leisegang was then given a position at Frankfurt University as a lecturer for the History of Philosophy, with particular emphasis on the philosophy of art theory (1971–1973), which he used to work on a philosophical analysis of the works of both Franz Kafka and Karl May. During this time, Leisegang began intensively examining fundamental questions underlying graphic design. This culminated in his Prolegomena on a Theory of Design, which Leisegang published in the newspaper design international in 1971 (whose editors were Leisegang himself, Anton Stankowski, and Horst Heiderhoff). In addition to this, he also toyed with prime numbers.

Leisegang put his teaching position in Frankfurt on hold in 1972 to take up a position as guest lecturer at the University of the Witwatersrand in Johannesburg (South Africa). Here, alongside a relational theory drafted in English, he began plans for a philosophic political paper on "Apartheid and Integration as Moments of a True Political Relationship between Black and White in South Africa" (Letter to Julius Schaaf on July 20, 1972). Unfortunately, his posit that one-sided political relationships would inevitably lead to foreseeable social and economic catastrophe, which drew from examples from South Africa, never came to fruition in the form of a paper, as his manuscript went missing during a move. However, it was discussed during his lectures. While still in South Africa, Leisegang explicitly withdrew his application for a chair position at J.W. Goethe University and left his lecturer position there to rest (Letter to J. Schaaf, July 20, 1972).

In August 1972 he returned to Germany due to the death of his father. He held the seminar "Philosophical Aspects of Literature, Karl May: Ardistan and Dschinnistan" in the winter semester of 1972/73, which, in a certain sense, came to be his legacy. Despite his successes, Leisegang committed suicide in the early hours of March 21, 1973. Shortly before this, he had written a letter informing the police of his impending suicide.

Works

Poetry collections
 Bilder der Frühe (Privately Printed), Offenbach am Main 1962.
 Aufbruch der Stille, Prose, Offenbach am Main 1963
 Übung eines Weges (Privateky Printed), Offenbach am Main 1964
 Brüche. Bläschke, Darmstadt 1964
 Überschreitungen. Bläschke, Darmstadt 1965
 Intérieurs. Jolei Holzschnitte. Afterword: Hans Hinterhäuser. Heiderhoff, Frankfurt 1966
 Hoffmann am Fenster. Drawings by Claire-Lise Holy. Afterword: Hans-Jürgen Heise. Heiderhoff, Frankfurt 1968
 Unordentliche Gegend. Aphorisms, Poems, Translations 1960–1970. Eight drawings by Jolei. Heiderhoff, Frankfurt 1971
 Aus privaten Gründen. Gedichte und Aphorismen. Heiderhoff, Frankfurt 1973
 Bei Abwesenheit von Wolken – Aphorismen zur Landschaft. Leisegangs Texts into images by Jolei. Heiderhoff, Echzell 1976
 Lauter letzte Worte. Gedichte und Miniaturen. Published with Afterword from Karl Corino. Suhrkamp, Frankfurt 1980
 Übung eines Weges. Gedichte. Pub. Roswitha Heiderhoff and Karl Corino, Heiderhoff, Eisingen 1986

Essays (Theory of Design)
 Die Form sichtbar machen, in: Katalog der Frankfurter Sezession, Frankfurt 1963
 Die Welt lesen, in: Horst Heiderhoff, Print and Typography, Mainz 1965
 Aber trenne die Schichten... Reflexionen zu Gedichten von Paul Lüth, in: Deutsches Ärzteblatt 7, 12. February 1966, p. 462–463
 Nachwort, in: Carl Schmachtenberg, Selected poems, Frankfurt [Druck der Horst-Heiderhoff-Presse 2] 1967
 Die Wahl einer Schrift, in: Horst Heiderhoff Typography, Wiesbaden 1967
 Was ist Grafik-Design und was kann es leisten?/What means Graphic-Design and what can it perform?, in: design international 2/[19]70, p. 8–17
 Prolegomena zu einer Theorie der Gestaltung I: Einleitung, in: design international 4/[19]70 [?], p. 6–7
 Prolegomena zu einer Theorie der Gestaltung II: Gestaltung und Information/Prolegomena to a Theory of  Designing II: Designing and Information, in: design international 1/[19]71 I, p. 54–60 [a slightly longer version entitled Gestalt – Information – Kunst, in: Druck-Print, 1/1971, S. 13–16; both versions stem from the same 26-page typoscript from Dieter Leisegang in the German Literature Archive Marbach; however, they vary respectively on the level of undergone revision]
 Aggression als Heilslehre, in: Der Literat, Issue 12, Frankfurt 1970
 Heinrich Wehmeiers didaktische Typographie, in: Der Polygraph, Supplement to Issue 20-[19]71
 Lücken im Publikum. Relatives und Absolutes bei Franz Kafka. In: Philosophie als Beziehungswissenschaft. Festschrift for Julius Schaaf. Heiderhoff, Frankfurt 1974, p. XVI/ 3–56

Philosophical Works
 Die drei Potenzen der Relation. Heiderhoff, Frankfurt 1969
 Dimension und Totalität. „Entwurf einer Philosophie der Beziehung“. Heiderhoff, Frankfurt 1972
 Philosophie als Beziehungswissenschaft. Festschrift for Julius Schaaf (Pub. with Wilhelm Friedrich Niebel). Heiderhoff, Frankfurt 1974

Mathematics
 Vorbereitende Ausführungen zum Thema: Primzahlentabellen im Zahlbereich über 10 hoch sieben, Typoscript o. J., 16 p. (Nachlass Dieter Leisegang, Deutsches Literaturarchiv Marbach)

Film and Radio Features
 Ein Fenster zur Welt, Gedichte von zehn slowenischen Autoren, Süddeutscher Rundfunk, 5. September 1968
 Erich Martin, Porträt eines Malers, Hessisches Fernsehen, 8. July 1969
 Dichter über ihre Dichtungen, Hessisches Fernsehen, 8. July 1969
 Die Pariser Biennale für junge Kunst, Hessisches Fernsehen, 22. October 1969
 Ich schreibe … Resignation und Tendenz in der deutschen Lyrik nach Auschwitz, Hessisches Fernsehen, 11. November 1969
 Die Gießener Musiktage 1969, ARD, 23. November 1969
 Aus dem Nachlaß der sechziger Jahre, ARD, 1. January 1970
 Kunst und Kitsch im Kinderbuch, Hessisches Fernsehen, 23. February 1970
 Die Kinderbuchmesse in Bologna, ARD, 25. April 1970

Broadcasts
 W. H. Auden, The Common Life, Darmstadt 1964
 W. H. Auden, The Cave of Making, Darmstadt 1965
 Hart Crane, Moment Fugue, Darmstadt: J. G. Bläschke Verlag (1966)
 Edvard Kocbek, Die Dialektik, Frankfurt 1968

Unfinished Works
 Gestaltung und Information [= Prolegomena zu einer Theorie der Gestaltung II], Typoscript, undated, 27 p. Din a 4
 Arbeitsexemplar Die drei Potenzen der Relation, with personal comments and supplements
 Lyrik und Computer, handwritten Ms., undated, 3 p. Din a 4
 Selbst-Rezension „Unordentliche Gegend", Typoskript, dat. 1971, 3. p. Din a 4
 Fragment: Ausgehend von einem alltäglichen Sachverhalt … [wohl 1. Disposition for Die drei Potenzen der Relation], undated, handwritten Ms., 2 p. Din a 4
 Dimension und Relation (Anhang zu Die drei Potenzen der Relation), handwritten Ms., dat. 26. January 1969, 3 p. Din a 5
 Vorwort zu Dimension und Totalität, handwritten on 2 envelopes, stamps 18. January72
 Fragment: Ästhetik, handschr. Ms., undated, 2 p. Din a 5
 Fragment: Das Ende der Einsamkeit, handwritten Ms., bez. „Dieter – Bärbel diktiert“, 4 p. Din a 4 mit „Inhaltsverzeichnis“ [„1. Das Ende der Einsamkeit, 2. Die Zerstörung der Kunst, 3. Alleinsein oder die uniformierte Gesellschaft“], undat.
 Typoskript from Dimension und Totalität, with personal revisions
 Rede zum 60. Geburtstag J. Schaafs Okt. 70, Typoskript, 4. p. Din a 4
 Letters from W. H. Auden to Leisegang

Literature 
 Julius Schaaf, Beziehung und Idee. Eine platonische Besinnung, in: Parusia. Studien zur Philosophie Platons und zur Problemgeschichte des Platonismus, Pub. K. Flasch, Frankfurt 1965, p. 3–20.
 Julius Schaaf, Statt eines Nachwortes. Rede zur Trauerfeier am 27. März, in: Leisegang, Aus privaten Gründen, Frankfurt 1973.
 Jörg Engelmann, Gesellschaft als Beziehung. Aspekte einer relationstheoretischen Soziologie des Denkens, Frankfurt 1974.
 Reiner Kunze, Rezension von Unordentliche Gegend und Aus privaten Gründen, in: [Source?] 1976 [quoted in: Corino, Das rettungslose Ich, p. 199–200].
 Karl Corino, Das rettungslose Ich. Zur Lyrik Dieter Leisegangs, in: Leisegang, Lauter letzte Worte, p. 199–213.
 Christoph von Wolzogen, Das Skandalon des Ich. Anmerkungen zur Lyrik Dieter Leisegangs, Review by: Leisegang, Lauter letzte Worte, in: Neue Zürcher Zeitung, Feuilleton, 18. September 1980, p. 37–38.
 Hans Dieter Schäfer, Dieter Leisegang, in: Die deutsche Lyrik 1945–1975, Düsseldorf 1981.
 Christoph von Wolzogen, Die autonome Relation. Zum Problem der Beziehung im Spätwerk von Paul Natorp. Ein Beitrag zur Geschichte der Theorien der Relation, Würzburg/Amsterdam 1984.
 
 Harald Hartung, Das leergelebte Leben, in: Frankfurter Anthologie 9, Frankfurt 1985.
 Christoph von Wolzogen, Artikel Relation IV – 20. Jahrhundert, in: Historisches Wörterbuch der Philosophie, Bd. 8, Basel 1992, p. 602–606.
 Petra Ernst, Dieter Leisegang, in: Lexikon der deutschsprachigen Gegenwartsliteratur, 2 Bde., pub. Thomas Kraft, München 2002.
 Paul Drechsel, on the „Logik der Globalisierung“, Kap. 2, Exkurs: Die Logik der Relation aRb as synopsis of separating and connecting, www.drechsel-science.de/Globalisierungs-Vortrag/Buch-Kapitel-2.pdf [vgl. full manuscript: www.drechsel-science.de/webseiten/globalisierung.htm].

External links 

 
Glanz und Elend – Autorenporträt und das Gedicht „Coca-Cola“
 Zwischen Absolutem und Kahlschlag; 2012 wäre Dieter Leisegang 70 Jahre alt geworden, retrieved on 3. Oktober 2018
 Gedichte von Dieter Leisegang (deutsch und spanisch)
Philosophie der Beziehung und Logik der Globalisierung – Kap. 2 aus Paul Drechsels Globalisierungs-Buch mit Hinweis auf Leisegang (S. 84–85) (PDF; 450 kB)

References

Beziehung und Idee, in: Parusia, Hg. Kurt Flasch, Frankfurt 1965, S. 3.
Beziehung und Idee, in: Parusia, Hg. Kurt Flasch, Frankfurt 1965, S. 17.
Die drei Potenzen der Relation, Frankfurt 1969, S. 100.
Dimension und Totalität, Frankfurt 1972, S. 40.

20th-century German philosophers
German male non-fiction writers
Translators from English
Translators from Slovene
Translators to German
German essayists
Academic staff of Goethe University Frankfurt
German male poets
1942 births
1973 deaths
20th-century German non-fiction writers
20th-century German poets
20th-century translators